PVFS may refer to:

Post-viral fatigue syndrome, a condition resulting from a viral infection
Parallel Virtual File System, a type of distributed file system